Escape velocity is the minimum speed an object without propulsion needs to have to move away indefinitely from the source of the gravity field.

Escape Velocity may also refer to:

Books

 Escape Velocity (Doctor Who), a Doctor Who novel
 Escape Velocity: Cyberculture at the End of the Century, a nonfiction book by Mark Dery
 Escape Velocity, prequel to the Warlock series by Christopher Stasheff

Video games

 Escape Velocity (video game)
 Escape Velocity Override, its sequel
 Escape Velocity Nova, the most recent title in the Escape Velocity franchise, along with an expandable card-driven board game based on it

Music

 "Escape Velocity" (song), a 2010 song by The Chemical Brothers
 Escape Velocity, an album by The Phenomenauts

Film and television
 "Escape Velocity" (Battlestar Galactica), an episode of the TV show Battlestar Galactica
 Escape Velocity (film), a 1998 Canadian thriller film

See also